Erwin Dampfhofer (born 30 August 1966) is a former Austrian footballer who played as a forward.

External links
 

1966 births
Living people
Austrian footballers
SV Ried players
Grazer AK players
Wiener Sport-Club players
DSV Leoben players
Association football forwards